Gene Siskel (January 26, 1946 – February 20, 1999) and Roger Ebert (June 18, 1942 – April 4, 2013), collectively known as Siskel & Ebert, were American film critics known for their partnership on television lasting from 1975 to Siskel's death in 1999.

At the time two of the most well-known film critics writing for Chicago newspapers (Siskel for the Tribune, Ebert for the rival Sun-Times), the two were first paired up as the hosts of a monthly show called Opening Soon at a Theatre Near You, airing locally on PBS member station WTTW. In 1978, the show — renamed Sneak Previews — was expanded to weekly episodes and aired on PBS affiliates all around the United States. In 1982, the pair left Sneak Previews to create the syndicated show At the Movies. Following a contract dispute with Tribune Media in 1986, Siskel and Ebert signed with Buena Vista Television, creating Siskel & Ebert & the Movies (later renamed Siskel & Ebert, and renamed again several times after Siskel's death).

Known for their sharp and biting wit, intense professional rivalry, heated arguments, and their binary "Thumbs Up or Thumbs Down" summations, the duo became a sensation in American popular culture. Siskel and Ebert remained partners and in the public eye right up until Siskel's death from a brain tumor in 1999.

Early careers
Siskel started writing for the Chicago Tribune in 1969, becoming its film critic soon after. Ebert joined the Chicago Sun-Times in 1966, and started writing about film for the paper in 1967. In 1975, Ebert became the first film critic to win the Pulitzer Prize for criticism.

Partnership 

Siskel and Ebert started their professional collaboration on the local Chicago PBS station WTTW with a show entitled Opening Soon at a Theatre Near You (1975-1977), before it was renamed two years later when the show was syndicated nationally to Sneak Previews (1977-1982). The show was later distributed by Tribune Broadcasting and changed to At the Movies (1982-1986), and final iteration of the show was when it was produced by The Walt Disney Company with Siskel & Ebert & the Movies (1986-1999). During its largely successful run with Siskel and Ebert as hosts, the series was nominated for various awards including for Daytime Emmy Awards as well as seven Primetime Emmy Awards including for Outstanding Information Series. Siskel died of a terminal brain cancer in 1999. Ebert continued with the series with rotating guest hosts which included Martin Scorsese, Janet Maslin, Peter Bogdanovich, Todd McCarthy, Lisa Schwarzbaum, Kenneth Turan, Elvis Mitchell, and the eventual replacement for Siskel, Richard Roeper.

Review style and trademarks 
Siskel and Ebert's reviewing style has been described as a form of midwestern populist criticism rather than the one formed through essays which other critics including Pauline Kael felt undermined and undervalued the profession of film criticism. They were criticized for their ability to sensationalize film criticism in an easygoing, relatable way. Together they are credited with forming modern day film criticism. The New York Times described Ebert's reviews as a “critic for the common man".

The pair were also known for their intense debate, often drawing sharp criticisms at each other. Ebert reminisced about the experience saying:

In 1983, the critics defended Star Wars films against critic John Simon in an episode of ABC News Nightline. The film Return of the Jedi (1983) had hit theaters that summer and Simon was criticizing the film for "making children dumber than they need to be". Ebert responded saying:

Preferences

Best films of the year
As critics, Siskel's first top ten list was in 1969; Ebert's had debuted in 1967. Over the life of their partnership, these were the two critics' #1 selections.
{| class="wikitable"
|-
! Year
! Siskel
! Ebert
|-
| 1969
| colspan="2"|
|-
| 1970
| My Night at Maud's
| Five Easy Pieces|-
| 1971
| Claire's Knee| The Last Picture Show|-
| 1972
| colspan="2" style="text-align:center;" |The Godfather|-
| 1973
| The Emigrants| Cries and Whispers|-
| 1974
| Day for Night| Scenes from a Marriage|-
| 1975
| colspan="2"|
|-
| 1976
| All the President's Men| Small Change|-
| 1977
| Annie Hall| 3 Women|-
| 1978
| Straight Time| An Unmarried Woman|-
| 1979
| Hair| Apocalypse Now|-
| 1980
| Raging Bull| The Black Stallion|-
| 1981
| Ragtime| My Dinner with Andre|-
| 1982
| Moonlighting| Sophie's Choice|-
| 1983
| colspan="2"|
|-
| 1984
| Once Upon a Time in America| Amadeus|-
| 1985
| Shoah| The Color Purple|-
| 1986
| Hannah and Her Sisters| Platoon|-
| 1987
| The Last Emperor| House of Games|-
| 1988
| The Last Temptation of Christ| Mississippi Burning|-
| 1989
| colspan="2" style="text-align:center;" |Do the Right Thing|-
| 1990
| colspan="2" style="text-align:center;" |GoodFellas|-
| 1991
| Hearts of Darkness| JFK|-
| 1992
| One False Move| Malcolm X|-
| 1993
| colspan="2" style="text-align:center;" |Schindler's List|-
| 1994
| colspan="2" style="text-align:center;" |Hoop Dreams|-
| 1995
| Crumb| Leaving Las Vegas|-
| 1996
| colspan="2"|
|-
| 1997
| The Ice Storm| Eve's Bayou|-
| 1998
| Babe: Pig in the City| Dark City|-
|}
Previously, Siskel and Ebert had separately agreed on Z and The Godfather before sharing the same opinion on Nashville, The Right Stuff, Do the Right Thing, GoodFellas, Schindler's List, Hoop Dreams, and Fargo.

Seven times, Siskel's #1 choice did not appear on Ebert's top ten list at all: Straight Time, Ragtime, Once Upon a Time in America, Shoah, The Last Temptation of Christ, Hearts of Darkness, and The Ice Storm. Eight times, Ebert's top selection did not appear on Siskel's; these films were Small Change, 3 Women, An Unmarried Woman, Apocalypse Now, Sophie's Choice, Mississippi Burning, Eve's Bayou, and Dark City. In 1985, Ebert declined to rank the Holocaust documentary Shoah as 1985's best film because he felt it was inappropriate to compare it to the rest of the year's candidates.

While Apocalypse Now appeared as Ebert's choice for best film of 1979 but not anywhere on Siskel's list, the documentary of the making of the film, Hearts of Darkness, was Siskel's choice for the best film of 1991 while not appearing on Ebert's list.

In addition, neither critic's choice for the best film of 1988 (The Last Temptation of Christ for Siskel and Mississippi Burning for Ebert) appeared anywhere on the other critic's list, but both starred Willem Dafoe.

 Advocacy 
The pair also advocated for up-and-coming filmmakers including Martin Scorsese, Spike Lee, Steve James, Quentin Tarantino, Jane Campion, Michael Moore and Werner Herzog.

They especially decried the lack of an Academy Award for Best Picture for Lee's Do the Right Thing (1989), and James' Hoop Dreams (1994).

 Appearances 
Siskel and Ebert were known for their many appearances on late night talk shows including appearing on The Late Show with David Letterman sixteen times and The Tonight Show Starring Johnny Carson fifteen times. They also appeared together on  The Oprah Winfrey Show, The Arsenio Hall Show, Howard Stern, The Tonight Show with Jay Leno, and Late Night with Conan O'Brien.

Normally, Siskel and Ebert would refuse to guest-star in movies or television series, as they felt it would undermine their "responsibility to the public." However, they both "could not resist" appearing on an episode of the animated television series The Critic, the title character of which was a film-critic who hosted a television show. In the episode, entitled "Siskel & Ebert & Jay & Alice" (which aired in 1995), Siskel and Ebert split and each wants Jay Sherman, the eponymous film critic, as his new partner. The episode is a parody of the film Sleepless in Seattle.

They also appeared as themselves on Saturday Night Live three times, 1982, 1983, and 1985. They appeared in the episode "Chevy Chase/Queen" (1982) where they reviewed sketches from the night's telecast.

In popular culture
Siskel and Ebert were satirized on the popular Nickelodeon series Doug'' in the episode "Doug's Monster Movie" in which they appear in a dream sequence and vote two thumbs down on Doug's home movie.

Awards and nominations
Siskel and Ebert received a Chicago Emmy Award for Outstanding Special Program in 1979. They also received seven Primetime Emmy Award nominations for Outstanding Informational Series. They also received three Daytime Emmy Award for Outstanding Special Class Series from 1989 to 1991.

References

External links

American film critics
Duos
Gene Siskel
Roger Ebert
Siskel and Ebert